Huntington Harbour is a community of about 3,500 people located in the northwestern section of Huntington Beach in Orange County, California. The five man-made islands in Huntington Harbour include: Admiralty, Davenport, Gilbert, Humboldt, and Trinidad.

History

Huntington Harbour construction began in 1963 at a cost of $200 million.  The harbors and peninsulas are located on the former site of the historic Sunset Bay Estuary wetlands. They were destroyed with dredging and filling to develop the land for the new community.

Huntington Harbour is bracketed to the south by the  Bolsa Chica Ecological Reserve and to the north by the  Naval Weapons Station Seal Beach.

The Huntington Harbour Yacht Club, with membership of about 300 people, was established in 1965. The club offers sailing lessons during the summer for disadvantaged youth.

Islands
Admiralty Island: This development contains 90 single-family residences, nearly all with water frontage.

Davenport Island: 227 home sites are evenly split between on-water and off-water locations.

Gilbert Island: Bounded by Admiralty Island to the west and the Main Channel to the east, it contains 100 home sites, two thirds of which are on-the-water locations.

Humboldt Island: Two-thirds of the 335 homes are on-water locations with views of Christiana Bay.

Trinidad Island: This is considered the most luxurious of the islands.

Arts and culture

There are five "Mother's beaches" in Huntington Harbour where local families bring their children to play in the sand and swim in the shallow water by shore. Kayakers and paddle boarders also use these beaches as access points to the harbour as well as swimmers who can enjoy long-distance swims undisturbed by waves and currents. Because of the relative shallowness of Huntington Harbour,  when compared to the ocean, the harbor is generally three to four degrees warmer than the ocean in summer and, conversely, three to four degrees cooler in winter.  Boat traffic is limited to  no wake. The harbour is patrolled by the Orange County Sheriff's Department Huntington Harbour Patrol and Huntington Beach Marine Fire Rescue.
  
Rowers, ranging from middle-schoolers to Olympic gold medalists, from the Southern California Scullers Club (SoCal Scullers) train daily on the main channel of Huntington Harbour.

During December, a boat parade takes place through the waterways.  Also during this time the "Cruise of Lights" occurs in which tour boats go around the channels viewing the decorated homes as a fundraiser.

Economy

The majority of the homes were originally built in the 1960s to late 1970s and feature three to six bedrooms that range from 2,090 to 6,739 square feet of living space. Although Huntington Harbour is primarily residential, with most homes varying from one to ten million dollars, there is a shopping center on Algonquin Street called the Huntington Harbour Mall. A Trader Joe's grocery store opened there in 2009. There are also two banks, a medical center, an optometrist, a hair salon, a UPS store, and several restaurants including the Harbour Rackhouse bar and grill, Red Table Restaurant, Tabu Shabu, VegiLicious Vegan Restaurant, A Slice of New York, and AoSa Coffee.

References

External links
Huntington Harbour Property Owners Association

Artificial islands of California
Islands of Orange County, California
Geography of Huntington Beach, California
Ports and harbors of California
Breakwaters
Populated coastal places in California
History of Orange County, California
Islands of Southern California
1963 establishments in California